The 2005 Air Canada Cup was the third edition of the women's ice hockey tournament. It was held from February 10-12, 2005 in Duisburg, Germany. The Canadian U22 national team won the tournament, going undefeated over three games.

Tournament

Results

Final table

External links
Tournament on hockeyarchives.info

2005–06
2005–06 in women's ice hockey
2005–06 in Swiss ice hockey
2005–06 in German ice hockey
2005–06 in Canadian women's ice hockey
2005–06 in Finnish ice hockey
2005